Andrejić is a Serbian surname, derived from the name Andrej. It may refer to:

Simona Andrejić, fashion model
Tijana Andrejic

See also
Andrejević
Andrijević
Andrić

Serbian surnames
Patronymic surnames
Surnames from given names